Feliciano Luces: Alyas Kumander Toothpick, Mindanao (marketed as Feliciano Luces: Alyas Kumander Toothpick) is a 1987 Filipino action film directed by Pablo Santiago and starring Ramon Revilla as the titular commander. It also stars Dang Cecilio, Rey Abellana, Tanya Gomez, Paquito Diaz, Raoul Aragonn, Charlie Davao, Esther Chavez, Romy Diaz, and Ruel Vernal. The film employs Revilla's usual formula of having his character own a protective amulet in battle. Produced by Vista Films as its inaugural film, it was released on July 15, 1987. Critic Mike Feria of the Manila Standard gave the film a negative review, criticizing its screenplay and Revilla's exaggerated acting.

Cast
Ramon Revilla as Feliciano Luces/Kumander Toothpick
Dang Cecilio
Rey Abellana
Tanya Gomez
Paquito Diaz
Charlie Davao as Mister Lazaro
Romy Diaz
Raoul Aragonn
Ruel Vernal
Johnny Madrid
Johnny Vicar
Karim Kiram
Yusuf Salim
Max Alvarado
Marilou Sadiua as Myrna
Carlos de Leon
Eddie Tuazon
Esther Chavez
Ramon de Salva
Ernie Zarate as the mayor
Fred Moro as a man of Lazaro

Themes
Feliciano Luces  is a continuation of Ramon Revilla's formula of portraying notorious or real-life characters who protect themselves with amulets ("anting-anting") in battle, sustaining a traditional belief of native Filipinos which has endured to contemporary times. Luces' death is depicted in the film as being caused by a spirit taking away his amulet.

Release
The film was given a "P" rating by the Movie and Television Review and Classification Board (MTRCB), and was released on July 15, 1987.

Critical response
Mike Feria of the Manila Standard gave Feliciano Luces a negative review, criticizing the screenplay's misguided storytelling and lack of focus as well as Revilla's acting ("here he is as ham as ever").

References

External links

1987 films
1987 action films
Action films based on actual events
Filipino-language films
Films about farmers
Philippine films about revenge
Philippine action films
Films directed by Pablo Santiago